Kathryn Theresa Schoepfer (born November 10, 1988) is an American coach and former professional soccer player, having last played for the Boston Breakers of National Women's Soccer League in 2016. She was formerly an assistant coach at the College of the Holy Cross and she is, currently, head coach of the United States girls' national under-15 soccer team.

Early life

While playing high school soccer at Waterford High School (Connecticut), Schoepfer broke the Connecticut high school state record for goals in a career, finishing with 157.  She also ranked second in career assists, totaling 47 in her career.  Schoepfer  earned Gatorade Connecticut player of the year honors and NSCAA high school All American honors during her career with the Lancers.

Penn State Nittany Lions
Schoepfer played collegiate soccer for the Penn State Nittany Lions women's soccer team, scoring 48 goals on 92 appearances while helping the team win 4 consecutive Big Ten championships. While at Penn State, Schoepfer was a four-time all Big Ten performer and a two-time NSCAA All-American, earning second team honors in 2007  and third team honors in 2009.  Additionally in 2009, Schoepfer was named the Big Ten Offensive Player of the Year, a first team NSCAA Scholar All-American,  was a nominee for the Lowe's Senior CLASS Award.  and semifinalist for the 2009 Hermann Trophy.

Playing career

Club
On January 15, 2010, Schoepfer was selected in the third round (26th overall) of the 2010 WPS Draft by Sky Blue FC. Schoepfer made five appearances for Sky Blue during the 2010 season.  Before the 2011 season, Schoepfer signed a contract with the Boston Breakers and made her first start against the Atlanta Beat on April 9, 2011.  Schoepfer scored her first professional goal and 2011 #5 goal of the year for the WPS in just her third career start during the June 5 game against MagicJack (WPS). Schoepfer netted again against the Atlanta Beat (WPS) on July 10, 2011.

On October 25, 2011, the Breakers announced that they had resigned Schoepfer for the 2012 season.  New Breakers head coach Lisa Cole said of the signing, "Shoep is another young player who has a ton of potential...She was able to score important goals for us in limited minutes last season. We're looking for her to have breakout season as well," Cole said. "She can score lot of goals for us this year, something that we were missing last year."

Schoepfer scored in the first ever WPSL Elite match against the ASA Chesapeake Charge on May 10, 2012, scoring the second goal in the 3–0 victory for the Breakers. Schoepfer finished the season with 7 goals and 6 assists.  On February 7, 2013 the Breakers drafted Schoepfer with their second pick, the eleventh overall, in the 2013 NWSL Supplemental Draft.  On February 18, the Breakers announced Schoepfer had officially signed with the team.

International

Schoepfer played for the United States U-23 women's national soccer team as well as the United States U-17 women's national soccer team.  In 2009, Schoepfer scored nine goals in six games in all competitions for the U-23 team. She made her international debut on May 15, 2009 against the Northern Ireland U-23 national team and scored her first international goal in a 3–1 victory against the England U-23 national team on July 7, 2009.

Coaching career
On November 18, 2021, Schoepfer appointed by the United States Soccer Federation head coach of the United States girls' national under-15 soccer team.

References

External links
 Boston Breakers (NWSL) player profile
Boston Breakers (WPS) player profile
US Soccer profile
Penn State player profile
 

1988 births
Living people
Sportspeople from New London, Connecticut
Penn State Nittany Lions women's soccer players
NJ/NY Gotham FC players
Boston Breakers players
Women's association football forwards
National Women's Soccer League players
Women's Professional Soccer players
Women's Premier Soccer League Elite players
American women's soccer players
Boston Aztec (WPSL) players